Charles Partridge may refer to:

Charles Partridge (footballer) (1867– after 1898), English professional footballer
Charles Partridge (anthropologist) (1872–1955)
Charlie Partridge, American football coach and former player (1973–)

See also
Charles Partridge Adams, American landscape artist